Monte calvario (English title:Mount Calvary) is a Mexican telenovela produced by Valentín Pimstein and Angelli Nesma Medina for Televisa in 1986. It is an original story Delia Fiallo of and directed by Beatriz Sheridan.

Edith González, Arturo Peniche and José Alonso starred as protagonists, while Úrsula Prats, Lili Inclán and Consuelo Frank starred as main antagonists.

Cast 
 
Edith González† as Ana Rosa Pérez Montalbán
Arturo Peniche as Dr. Gustavo Seckerman
José Alonso as Octavio Montero
Úrsula Prats as Olivia Montero
Lili Inclán† as Tomasa
Aurora Molina† as Chana
René Muñoz† as Father Cito
Alfonso Iturralde as Roberto #1
Odiseo Bichir as Roberto #2
Consuelo Frank† as Rosario
Javier Herranz as Carlos
Julia Marichal† as Matilde
María Idalia as La Loca/Ana Teresa
Alejandro Landero as Margarito
Lizzeta Romo as Elisa
Juan Carlos Serrán† as Juan Camacho
Sylvia Suárez as Mercedes Seckerman
Raquel Parot as Mother Director
Rosa María Bianchi as Esther
Leticia Calderón as Tere
Ricardo Cervantes as Inspector
Alejandro Tommasi as Caleta Montero
Patricia Dávalos as Mama
Omar Fierro as Román
Armando Franco as Jaime
Pedro Geraldo as Graciano
Antonio González as Judge
Christopher Lago as Marito
Dalilah Polanco as Chole
Rodolfo Lago as Fermín
Ismael Larumbe as Doctor
David Rencoret as Felipe
Armando Palomo as Julio
Aurora Clavel† as Fernanda
Liliana Weimer as Susanna
Pedro Damián as Alfonso
Jorge Lavat† as Armando Montero
Armando Calvo† as Antonio
Gerardo Klein as Gerardo
Stella Inda 
Héctor Catalán as Bernardo
Lei Quintana as Juliana
Ernesto del Castillo 
Bertha Cervera as Martilia
Jaime Lozano 
Patricia Mayers 
Denise Rendón 
Talia 
Alonso Sandoval as Gustavito
Juan Verduzco as Doctor
Eduardo Diaz Reyna as Comisario
Macario Álvarez as Agent

Awards

References

External links

1986 telenovelas
Mexican telenovelas
1986 Mexican television series debuts
1986 Mexican television series endings
Spanish-language telenovelas
Television shows set in Mexico City
Televisa telenovelas